Spy Hill is a village in the Canadian province of Saskatchewan within the Rural Municipality of Spy Hill No. 152 and Census Division No. 5. It is at the intersection of Highway 8 and Highway 600. The Northland Power - Spy Hill Power Plant is located in the community.

History 
Spy Hill incorporated as a village on April 22, 1910.

Demographics 

References

Villages in Saskatchewan
Spy Hill No. 152, Saskatchewan
Division No. 5, Saskatchewan